Southern School of Energy and Sustainability (also known as Southern or Southern Durham) is located in Durham, North Carolina, United States. The school is part of Durham Public Schools.

Notable alumni
 Dimple Ajmera, politician and Certified Public Accountant serving on the Charlotte City Council
 Clyde Edgerton, author and creative writing professor
Julian Gamble (born 1989), basketball player in the Israeli Basketball Premier League
 David Garrard, NFL quarterback and Pro Bowl selection in 2009
 Kendall Hinton, NFL wide receiver and quarterback
 Anthony King, professional basketball player
 David Noel, NBA player and 2005 NCAA basketball champion with UNC
 Jazmin Truesdale, creator of AZA comics, a comic book that features diverse female characters

References

External links
 Official website

Public high schools in North Carolina
Durham Public Schools
Schools in Durham County, North Carolina